William Wampler may refer to:
 William C. Wampler (1926–2012), U.S. Representative from Virginia
 William C. Wampler Jr. (born 1959), member of the Senate of Virginia
 Will Wampler (William Creed Wampler III, born 1991), member of the Virginia House of Delegates
 Bill Wampler, American basketball player